If You Could See Me Now is an album by vocalist Etta Jones that was recorded in 1978 and released on the Muse label.

Track listing
 "What a Little Moonlight Can Do" (Harry M. Woods) – 3:59
 "Ghost of a Chance" (Victor Young, Ned Washington) – 5:00
 "I Saw Stars" (Maurice Sigler, Al Goodhart, Al Hoffman) – 4:24
 "If You Could See Me Now" (Tadd Dameron) – 6:35
 "I'm in the Mood for Love" (Jimmy McHugh, Dorothy Fields) – 5:43
 "It Could Happen to You" (Jimmy Van Heusen, Johnny Burke) – 3:30
 "The Way We Were" (Alan Bergman, Marilyn Bergman, Marvin Hamlisch) – 4:17
 "Ain't Misbehavin'" (Andy Razaf, Fats Waller, Harry Brooks) – 4:09

Personnel
Etta Jones – vocals
Houston Person – tenor saxophone
Sonny Phillips  – keyboards
Sam Jones – bass
Larry Killian – percussion
Idris Muhammad – drums
George Devens – vibraphone
Melvin Sparks – guitar

References

Muse Records albums
Etta Jones albums
Albums recorded at Van Gelder Studio
1979 albums